The 1999 Durham mayoral election was held on November 2, 1999 to elect the mayor of Durham, North Carolina. It saw the reelection of incumbent mayor Nick Tennyson.

Results

Primary 
The date of the primary was October 5, 1999.

General election

References 

Durham
Mayoral elections in Durham, North Carolina
Durham